Jackson Academy may refer to:

Jackson Academy (Alabama), Jackson, Alabama
Jackson Academy (Mississippi), Jackson, Mississippi
Jackson Academy (Virginia), Newport News, Virginia

See also
 Jackson School (disambiguation)